A skydiver is a person who engages in the sport of parachuting. 

It may also refer to:

 Skydiver (ride), an amusement ride designed and manufactured by Chance Rides
 Skydiver (submarine), a futuristic submarine featured in the TV series UFO
 The Skydivers, a 1963 film by Coleman Francis
 Sky Diver, a 1978 arcade game, later ported to Atari 2600
 Sky Diving (video game), a 2008 video game for the PlayStation 3
"Sky Diver", a 2008 song by Owl City from Maybe I'm Dreaming

See also

 Parachutist
 Paratrooper
 Spacediver
 
 
 Skydive (disambiguation)
 Diver (disambiguation)
 Sky (disambiguation)
 Paratrooper (disambiguation)